WMGS (92.9 FM, "Magic 93") is a commercial FM radio station licensed to serve Wilkes-Barre, Pennsylvania. The station is owned by Cumulus Media, through licensee Radio License Holding CBC, LLC, and broadcasts an adult contemporary format.

History
The station began operation back in 1946. By the 1960s, the station was known as "Whiz Radio" with the call letters WYZZ. The station had a broad based adult standards format, playing music from the 1930s, 1940s, early 1950s, along with non rock and limited amounts of soft rock hits from the late 1950s, 1960s, and 1970s. Core artists included Frank Sinatra, Bing Crosby, Neil Diamond, Peggy Lee, Nat "King" Cole, Ray Charles, Harry James, Ella Fitzgerald, Barbra Streisand, softer Elvis Presley, Tony Bennett, Tommy Dorsey, Lettermen, Doris Day, Carpenters, Jack Jones, Kay Starr, Frankie Laine, and many more. The station played standards from Monday through Saturday from 6 a.m. to 12 p.m., 3 p.m. to 8 p.m., and from midnight to 6 a.m.
The station played Classical music Monday through Saturday 12 p.m. to 3 p.m. and 8 p.m. to midnight. On Sundays, the station played standards about half the day. The other half of the day included specialty programming such as a Polka show, Irish music program, a big band show, among others. WYZZ was the sixth FM station in the United States to broadcast in stereo. During the 1960s it was also one of the first stations to broadcast live stereo remotes, the Wyoming Valley Oratorio Society and the Northeast Pa. Philharmonic. If the station did not broadcast the local classical organizations live, they recorded them and played them back at a future date. Every Classical music performance from the New York border to Hazleton was generally broadcast by WYZZ. WYZZ was an experimental ground for several developments in the art of FM radio. When originally established in 1946 as WIZZ, it was put on the air with the assistance of Major Edwin Armstrong and it was part of his FM network. One of the first vertical polarized antennas was installed there along with a transit radio service and multiplex subcarriers. In later years, the stations experimented with Dolby noise reduction and Quad broadcasting. It was one of the very few radio stations in the country to use no audio processing during the periods of classical programming rather have competent board operators ride gain. In 1972, during Hurricane Agnes, WYZZ was the only Wilkes Barre area radio station to remain on the air and deliver vital information to the public for several weeks due to its having its own generators and microwave STL and both studio and transmitter located high out of the flood area. The station was owned by Dick Evans Sr.

The station was sold to Susquehanna Broadcasting the spring of 1985. The sale only included the transmitter and license. The building, music library, and licensing rights to the "Whiz Radio" unit were retained by Dick Evans Sr. The station went off the air for the last time at 11:59 p.m. on March 12, 1985.

WMGS Magic 93 signed on the next morning on March 12 at 6 a.m. with an adult contemporary/soft rock format. Core artists included Billy Joel, Beatles, Wham, James Taylor, Phil Collins, Stevie Wonder, Madonna, Kenny Loggins, Elton John, Supremes, and many more. The station played the best mix of the 1960s, 1970s, 1980s, and a decent amount of current product. In the 1990s artists like Hootie & The Blowfish, Janet Jackson, Seal, Mariah Carey, Celine Dion, Sheryl Crow, and others were added. The station stayed the course as a mainstream adult contemporary station, rather than evolve to Hot AC, like some stations did. The station remained successful.

In 1997, WMGS, along with WARM, was sold to Citadel Broadcasting. The format continued to not change substantially, though the station plays mostly music from 1980 to today at this time. A small amount of music from the late 1960s and 1970s is mixed in. Citadel merged with Cumulus Media on September 16, 2011.

References

External links
 
 

MGS
Cumulus Media radio stations
Radio stations established in 1946
1946 establishments in Pennsylvania